Sonny Side Up is an album by trumpeter Dizzy Gillespie, and the tenor saxophonists Sonny Stitt and Sonny Rollins, recorded in December 1957 in New York City. It was released in 1959 on producer Norman Granz's newly launched Verve label.

Reception
As Thomas Cunniffe has written, "The pairing of Rollins and Stitt was highly inspired. More important than their common nicknames (and the punning album title), tenor saxophonists Rollins and Stitt were both influenced by Charlie Parker, but each took a vastly different approach to improvisation. Stitt transferred Parker's white-hot intensity to the tenor after several fans and critics pointed out the tonal similarity of their alto sounds. Rollins was a more thoughtful player who expanded the vocabulary of bop improvisation by incorporating thematic elements into his solos and by experimenting with different melodic shapes and unusual phrase lengths."

Pianist Ray Bryant, bassist Tommy Bryant, and drummer Charlie Persip form the rhythm section. Stephen Cook of AllMusic described the album as "one of the most exciting 'jam session' records in the jazz catalog. ...both a highly enjoyable jazz set and something of an approximation of the music's once-revered live cutting session".

Track listing
"On the Sunny Side of the Street" (Jimmy McHugh, Dorothy Fields) – 5:41
"The Eternal Triangle" (Stitt) – 14:10
"After Hours" (Avery Parrish) – 12:19
"I Know That You Know" (Vincent Youmans, Anne Caldwell) – 5:27

Personnel
Dizzy Gillespie – trumpet, vocal (track 1)
Sonny Stitt – tenor saxophone
Sonny Rollins – tenor saxophone
Ray Bryant – piano
Tommy Bryant – double bass
Charlie Persip – drums

Additional personnel
Burt Goldblatt – cover photography
Nat Hentoff – liner notes

References 

Dizzy Gillespie albums
Sonny Stitt albums
Sonny Rollins albums
Albums produced by Norman Granz
Verve Records albums
1959 albums